Azusa Downtown station is an at-grade light rail station on the L Line of the Los Angeles Metro Rail system. It is located on Alameda Avenue, a block north of Foothill Boulevard, in Downtown Azusa, after which the station is named.

This station opened on March 5, 2016, as part of Phase 2A of the Foothill Extension project. This station and all the other original Gold Line and Foothill Extension stations will be part of the A Line upon completion of the Regional Connector project in 2023.

History 
The original train stop in Azusa opened in 1887 by the Los Angeles and San Gabriel Valley Railroad. The Gold Line uses the old right of way of the Los Angeles and San Gabriel Valley Railroad, which built the first train tracks and 1887 station in Azusa. The Los Angeles and San Gabriel Valley Railroad was founded in 1883, by James F. Crank with the goal of bringing a rail line to San Gabriel Valley from downtown Los Angeles. The Los Angeles and San Gabriel Valley Railroad was sold on May 20, 1887 to the California Central Railway. In 1889 this was consolidated into Southern California Railway Company. On January 17, 1906, the Southern California Railway was sold to the Atchison, Topeka and Santa Fe Railway and called the Pasadena Subdivision. Santa Fe, later Amtrak, ran the Southwest Chief and Desert Wind over this line in Azusa, but relocated the Desert Wind to the Fullerton Line in 1986.  The Santa Fe line served the San Gabriel Valley until 1994, when the 1994 Northridge earthquake weakened the bridge in Arcadia and the track was closed until the Gold Line was built. The Santa Fe 1888 Azusa station depot was completely remodeled in 1946.

Service

Station layout

Hours and frequency

Connections 
, the following connections are available:

References 

Railway stations in the United States opened in 2016
L Line (Los Angeles Metro) stations
Azusa, California
2016 establishments in California
Former Atchison, Topeka and Santa Fe Railway stations in California